WPGM-FM (96.7 FM) is a religious formatted radio station licensed to serve Danville, Pennsylvania. The station is owned by Montrose Broadcasting Corp.

References

External links
 
 
 

PGM-FM
Radio stations established in 1967